Madeley railway station is a disused railway station in Staffordshire, England.

The station was opened by the Grand Junction Railway in 1837.  It closed in 1952.

References
Notes

Sources

Further reading

Disused railway stations in Staffordshire
Former London and North Western Railway stations
Railway stations in Great Britain closed in 1952
Railway stations in Great Britain opened in 1837